The Parker Quartet is a string quartet.

History 

The Parker Quartet was founded in 2002 at the New England Conservatory, and enrolled in the Professional String Quartet Program during 2006–2008. They held residencies as Artists-in-Residence at the University of St. Thomas, Quartet-in-Residence at the University of Minnesota, Quartet-in-Residence with the St. Paul Chamber Orchestra, and Artists-in-Residence with Minnesota Public Radio before becoming the current Blodgett Artists-in-Residence at Harvard University's Department of Music as Professors of the Practice, as well as Quartet-in-Residence at the University of South Carolina.

Members 

 Daniel Chong, violin 1
 Ken Hamao, violin 2
 Jessica Bodner, viola
 Kee-Hyun Kim, cello

Awards 
The Parker Quartet have won the Concert Artists Guild Competition in 2005, Grand Prix and Mozart Prize at Bordeaux International String Quartet Competition (now the Vibre! Festival) in 2005, and Chamber Music America’s Cleveland Quartet Award in 2009. Their recording of György Ligeti quartets on Naxos Records won a Grammy Award for Best Chamber Music Performance in 2011.

Recordings 

 György Kurtág and Antonín Dvořák" with Kim Kashkashian (2021) ECM Records
 Beethoven: String Quartets op. 18, 59, 74 (2019) Festival Printemps des Arts de Monte-Carlo
 Mendelssohn: String Quartets op. 44 nos. 1 & 3 (2016) Nimbus Records
 Augusta Read Thomas: Of Being is a Bird (2016) Nimbus Records
 Jeremy Gill: Capriccio (2015) Innova Recordings
 Ligeti: String Quartets Nos. 1 & 2 (2009) Naxos Records
 Bartók: String Quartets Nos. 2 & 5 (2008) Zig Zag Records

References 

Year of birth missing (living people)
Living people
Quartets